Marina Koshevaya (born April 1, 1960 in Moscow) is a former Soviet swimmer and olympic champion. She competed at the 1976 Olympic Games in Montreal, Quebec, Canada, where she received a gold medal in 200 m breaststroke, and a bronze medal in 100 m breaststroke.

References

1960 births
Living people
Soviet female swimmers
Russian female swimmers
Russian female breaststroke swimmers
Olympic swimmers of the Soviet Union
Swimmers at the 1976 Summer Olympics
Olympic gold medalists for the Soviet Union
Olympic bronze medalists in swimming
Swimmers from Moscow
Medalists at the 1976 Summer Olympics
Olympic bronze medalists for the Soviet Union
Olympic gold medalists in swimming